Carodista notolychna is a moth in the family Lecithoceridae. It is found in Taiwan and Japan.

The wingspan is 12–18 mm. The species is variable in size. The forewings are uniform rather dark grey and the hindwings are grey.

References

Moths described in 1936
Carodista
Moths of Japan